Topole is a settlement in the Municipality of Rogaška Slatina in eastern Slovenia. The wider area around Rogaška Slatina is part of the traditional region of Styria. It is now included in the Savinja Statistical Region.

References

External links
Topole on Geopedia

Populated places in the Municipality of Rogaška Slatina